"Üç Kalp" is a pop song from Turkish girl group Hepsi's debut album, Bir (2005).

Music video
The music video is a simple video made of two scenes, one being set in a dark room and the other being set in water, this gives an aqua feel to the video.
This is an old song of a well-known Turkish singer: Ajda Pekkan.
This is the first music video not to contain any choreographed dancing by the girls.

External links
"Üç Kalp" Music Video

2006 singles
Hepsi songs
Turkish songs
2005 songs